Stunt is the fourth full-length studio album by Canadian alternative rock band Barenaked Ladies. Their most successful album, it entered the US charts at No. 3 and sold over 4 million units by the end of its chart run. Its first single, "One Week" became the band's breakthrough single in the US market by hitting No. 1 (selling over 5 million copies). The song also reached No. 5 in the UK, and helped revitalize their career in the band's home country of Canada, where their fame had diminished since the days of their debut album Gordon. In addition, follow-up singles "It's All Been Done", "Alcohol" and "Call and Answer" were each successful to some degree.

Stunt is the first studio album to feature keyboardist/guitarist Kevin Hearn, who originally joined the band for the Born on a Pirate Ship tour in 1995. Shortly after the release of the album, Hearn was diagnosed with leukemia. He spent the Stunt tour receiving chemotherapy and was replaced by Chris Brown and Greg Kurstin in the interim.

As with each of their earlier albums, the band recorded one song, "Alcohol", completely naked.

Special edition and reissues
There was also a special edition of the album which contained the standard 13 tracks plus a second disc including two versions of "Brian Wilson" (the album version and the "2000" version), and live versions of "The Old Apartment", "Jane", "When I Fall", "If I Had $1000000" and "Straw Hat and Old Dirty Hank".

The album was released on vinyl June 2, 2015.

In 2018, Rhino Records announced a 20th Anniversary Edition to be released digitally on July 6, 2018, as well as physical copies on September 28, 2018. However, the date was pushed back to October 19, 2018. The physical forms come in a vinyl and a CD/DVD set. The DVD is the documentary for Barenaked In America, which was never previously released in North America. The album also contains the bonus tracks "She's On Time" and "Long Way Back Home". The CD version also adds "Get In Line", which appeared on the soundtrack to King of the Hill.

Track listing

Personnel
Adapted from the Stunt booklet.

Barenaked Ladies
Jim Creeggan – electric bass (2, 6, 11), violin (5), electric double bass (1, 13), cello (7, 11), background vocals (2, 5, 6, 8, 9, 10, 11, 12, 13), double bass (3,  4,  5,  7, 8, 9, 10, 12), arco bass (11), handclaps (8), acoustic double bass (13)
Kevin Hearn – organ (8), synthesizer (6, 7, 11), banjo (4), piano (6, 7, 12), accordion (4), electric guitar (1, 5, 8, 11), keyboards (1, 2, 3, 4, 5, 9, 12, 13), electric piano (3),  background vocals (2, 3, 4, 8, 9, 10, 12),  clavinet (10), melodica (8), sampling (13), wah wah guitar (5), handclaps (8)
Steven Page – acoustic guitar (2, 3, 4, 13),  electric guitar (2, 6, 10),  background vocals (1, 3, 5, 7, 9, 10, 11), flute (10), piano (11), lead vocals (2, 4, 6, 7, 8, 13), phat drumz guy (9), co-lead vocals (12), handclaps (8)
Ed Robertson – acoustic guitar (all but 4), electric guitar (all but 13), percussion (12), background vocals (1, 2, 4, 6, 8, 13), lead vocals (3, 5, 9, 10, 11), co-lead vocals (12), dans la maison (1), invisible rap (6),  "Employee of the Month-July 1985" (9), handclaps (8)
Tyler Stewart – percussion (2, 5, 6, 7, 10, 12, 13),  bongos (6, 8),  drums (1, 2, 3, 4, 5, 6, 7, 8, 9, 10, 11), background vocals (2, 9, 10), dans la maison (1), snare drums (12), handclaps (8)

Additional personnel
Colin Alexander – scratching (9)
Pierre "French Pete" Tremblay – background vocals (10)
Natasha Hébert – Parlez Français (2)
Sue Drew – Expert Violin Tuning (5)
"Party" recorded live at Jimmy C's birthday (6)
"Hala Hala Hala" sampled by Don Garbutt (10)

Production
Producers – Barenaked Ladies, David Leonard, Susan Rogers
Engineers – David Leonard, Susan Rogers
Assistant engineers – Charlie Brocco, Femio Hernández, Boo Macleod, Kevin Szymanski
Mixing – David Leonard, Tom Lord-Alge
Mastering – Stephen Marcussen
Design – John Rummen
Photography – Jay Blakesberg
Artwork – John Rummen

Charts

Certifications

References

Barenaked Ladies albums
1998 albums
Reprise Records albums
Albums produced by David Leonard (record producer)
Juno Award for Pop Album of the Year albums